Colle delle Finestre (el. 2178 m.) is a mountain pass in the Cottian Alps, in the Italian region of Piemonte, Italy, linking the Susa Valley and Val Chisone. The road was built around 1700 to gain access to the fortresses in the area, mainly the Forte di Fenestrelle.

The road is very popular for both cyclists and motorbikes with magnificent views of the surrounding mountain ranges. It serves as a tourist attraction. Eight kilometers of road leading to the summit from the Susa end have not been asphalted. From Susa the mountain pass is 18.6 kilometres long at an average of 9.1% (height gain: 1694 m), the maximum gradient being 14%.

Giro d'Italia

See also
 List of highest paved roads in Europe
 List of mountain passes
 Cycling Details for Colle delle Finestre

Finestre
Finestre